The Cheonan Football Center Stadium is a football-specific stadium and training ground in Cheonan, South Korea. The stadium holds 2,881 spectators. It was built in 2008.

It is the former home of the Korea National League side Cheonan FC and the K3 League side Cheonan City FC.

References

Football venues in South Korea
Sports venues in South Gyeongsang Province
Sports venues completed in 2008
2008 establishments in South Korea